Jean Lucas may refer to:
Jean Lucas (footballer) (born 1998), Brazilian footballer
Jean Lucas (racing driver) (1917–2003), French racing driver
Jean Maximilien Lucas, French bookseller and publisher
Jean Jacques Étienne Lucas, French Navy officer
Jean Lucas-Dubreton (1883–1972), pseudonym of French historian and biographer Jean-Marie Lucas de Peslouan